Carla Castiglione (born ) is an Argentine female volleyball player. She is part of the Argentina women's national volleyball team.

She participated in the 2015 FIVB Volleyball World Grand Prix.
At club level she played for San Lorenzo in 2015.

References

1989 births
Living people
Argentine women's volleyball players
Place of birth missing (living people)